Przemysław Banaszak (born 10 May 1997) is a Polish professional footballer who plays as a forward for Uzbekistan Super League club Pakhtakor.

Club career
On 26 July 2022, after spending three years with Górnik Łęczna, Banaszek joined Uzbek side Pakhtakor, becoming the first Polish player in the club's history. He previously played for Hetman Żółkiewka, Chełmianka Chełm and Widzew Łódź.

Honours
Pakhtakor
Uzbekistan Super League: 2022

References

External links
 
  
 

1997 births
Living people
Polish footballers
Association football forwards
Chełmianka Chełm players
Widzew Łódź players
Górnik Łęczna players
Pakhtakor Tashkent FK players
IV liga players
III liga players
II liga players
I liga players
Ekstraklasa players
Uzbekistan Super League players
Polish expatriate footballers
Expatriate footballers in Uzbekistan